642 Clara is a minor planet orbiting the Sun. Discovered by Max Wolf in 1907, it is named after one of the housekeepers in Wolf's household.

References

External links
 
 

Background asteroids
Clara
Clara
S-type asteroids (Tholen)
L-type asteroids (SMASS)
19070908